Miranda is a feminine given name of Latin origin, meaning "worthy of admiration". There are several variants. The given name is said to have been invented by William Shakespeare for a character in his play The Tempest.

Usage
The name has been well used in the Anglosphere since the 20th century. Usage of the name in the United States peaked during the 1990s, when it was among the 100 most popular names for American girls. It also peaked in usage in the 1990s or early years of the 21st century in countries such as Canada, the United Kingdom, Spain, and Sweden.  It has also been well used in other Spanish speaking countries such as Mexico, where it was among the 100 most popular names for Mexican girls in 2020 and 2021.

People
 Miranda (born 1984), Colombian singer, winner of La Voz Colombia
 Miranda Carter (born 1965), English writer and biographer
 Miranda Chartrand (born 1990), Canadian singer
 Miranda Connell (born 1938), English actress
 Miranda Cooper (born 1975), English pop singer
 Miranda Cosgrove (born 1993), American actress and singer
 Miranda Devine, Australian columnist and writer
 Miranda Fenner (1979–1998), American female youth who was murdered
 Miranda Gibson, Australian environmental activist and school teacher
 Miranda Grell, British Labour party politician found guilty of making false statements against her political opponent
 Miranda Grosvenor, bored fan in the US who made a full-time hobby of calling stars
 Miranda Hart (born 1972), English actress and comedian
 Miranda Hill (1836–1910), English social reformer
 Miranda Jarrett, pen name for American author Susan Holloway Scott
 Miranda July, American performance artist
 Miranda Kerr, Australian model, Victoria's Secret Angel
 Miranda Krestovnikoff, British television presenter
 Miranda Kwok, Canadian actor and film producer
 Miranda Lambert, American country and western singer-songwriter
 Miranda Lee, Australian author of romance novels
 Miranda Leek, American archer
 Miranda Macmillan, Countess of Stockton (1947–2020), British socialite and fashion model
 Miranda Myrat, Greek actress
 Miranda Nild (born 1997), Thai footballer
 Miranda Otto, Australian film and theatre actress
 Miranda Raison, English actress
 Miranda Lee Richards, American singer-songwriter
 Miranda Richardson, Academy Award-nominated English actress
 Miranda Sawyer, English journalist and broadcaster
 Miranda Seymour, English literary critic, novelist, and biographer
 Miranda Stone, Canadian singer-songwriter
 Miranda Weese, American ballet dancer
 Miranda Yang (Xia Meng) (1933-2016), Hong Kong actress

Fictional characters
 Miranda (The Tempest), in the play The Tempest by English writer William Shakespeare
 Miranda, one of the characters from the Diva Starz toy line
 Miranda, the titular character of Miranda
 Miranda, the schoolgirl who goes missing in Picnic at Hanging Rock by Joan Lindsay
 Miranda (Doctor Who), in the British novel series Eighth Doctor Adventures
 Miranda (W.I.T.C.H.), in the American television series W.I.T.C.H.
 Miranda Bailey, Chief of Surgery and attending general surgeon at Grey-Sloan Memorial Hospital in the American television series Grey's Anatomy
 Miranda Barlow, from the Starz series Black Sails
 Miranda Carroll, from 2014 fiction novel Station Eleven by Canadian author Emily St. John Mandel
 Miranda Corneille, in the Canadian webcomic User Friendly
 Miranda Evans, in the British soap opera Doctors
 Miranda Feigelsteen, in the Canadian television series Mysterious Ways
 Miranda Goshawk, in the Harry Potter novel series by English author J. K. Rowling
 Miranda Grey, in the novel The Collector by English author John Fowles
 Miranda Hillard, the ex-wife of the main protagonist in the 1993 movie Mrs. Doubtfire
 Miranda Hobbes, in the American television series Sex and the City
 Miranda Jeffries, in the American film Chances Are
 Miranda Jones, in the anime series Transformers: Energon
 Miranda Jones, from Star Trek The Original Series, Episode Is There No Truth In Beauty?
 Miranda Keyes, in the American video game series Halo
 Miranda Killgallen, in the American television series As Told By Ginger
 Miranda Lawson, in the Mass Effect series
 Miranda Lotto, in the manga D.Gray-Man and the anime of the same name
 Miranda Montgomery, in the American television series All My Children
 Miranda North, in the film Life
 Miranda Priestly, in the novel The Devil Wears Prada by American author Lauren Weisberger
 Miranda Sanchez, in the American television series Lizzie McGuire
 Miranda Sings, character created on YouTube by Colleen Ballinger
 Miranda Tate, played by Marion Cotillard in the 2012 film The Dark Knight Rises
 Miranda Wright, in the American television series Bonkers
 Miranda Kristofich, character in the video game The Callisto Protocol

References

Feminine given names
English feminine given names
English given names invented by fiction writers
Latin feminine given names